Cesare Campa (born 8 March 1943) is an Italian politician from Murano, Veneto.

A long-time Christian Democrat, he was elected to the Regional Council of Veneto for Forza Italia in 1995 and 2000. From 1995 to 2000 Campa was regional minister of Labour and Sports in Galan I Government. In the 2001 general election he was elected to the Chamber of Deputies and re-elected in 2006.

References

Politicians from the Metropolitan City of Venice
1943 births
Living people
People from Murano
Christian Democracy (Italy) politicians
Forza Italia politicians
Deputies of Legislature XIV of Italy
Deputies of Legislature XV of Italy
Members of the Regional Council of Veneto